Ladis is a municipality in the district of Landeck (district) in the Austrian state of Tyrol located 9.5 km south of Landeck and 1.4 km west of Faggen. The village is known because of its sulphur and sour springs. Another important source of income is ski tourism.

References

External links

Cities and towns in Landeck District